Phillis Levin (born 1954 Paterson, New Jersey) is an American poet.

Life
Levin is the daughter of Charlotte E. Levin and Herbert L. Levin of Yardley, Pennsylvania. She graduated from Sarah Lawrence College in 1976, and Johns Hopkins University in 1977. She was an Associate Professor of English at The University of Maryland, College Park, and is currently a visiting professor in the graduate writing program at New York University and a teaching poet-in-residence at Hofstra University. She is also an elector of the American Poets' Corner of the Cathedral Church of Saint John the Divine, and the co-director of the Sarah Lawrence Language Exchange. She is a member of PEN. Her poems have been published in Poets for Life, Poetry, Ploughshares, AGNI, and The New Yorker.

On May 17, 2008, she married Jack Shanewise, at the Century Association in New York. They live in New York City.

Awards
 1986 Ingram Merrill Award
 1988 Norma Farber First Book Award
 1995 Fulbright Fellowship to Slovenia
 1999-2000 Amy Lowell Poetry Travelling Scholarship
 2000 Bogliasco Fellowship
 2003 Guggenheim Fellowship
 2006 Richard Hugo Award from Poetry Northwest
 2007 National Endowment for the Arts Fellowship.

Works
 
 
 
 
  
 "End of April", Poetry 180, Library of Congress

Books

Editor
 
 2009 Pushcart Prize XXXIII Best of the Small Presses

Translation

Anthologies
 Alhambra Poetry Calendar 2008 (Alhambra Publishing, 2008)
 Poetry 180: A Turning Back to Poetry (Random House, 2003)
 The Best American Poetry 1998 (Scribner, 1998)
 The Best American Poetry 1989 (Scribner, 1989)

References

1955 births
Living people
Writers from Paterson, New Jersey
Sarah Lawrence College alumni
Johns Hopkins University alumni
University of Maryland, College Park faculty
New York University faculty
Hofstra University faculty
American women poets
American women academics
21st-century American women